The men's national basketball team of the United States won the gold medal at the 2016 Summer Olympics in Rio de Janeiro, Brazil. They automatically qualified for the Olympics by winning the FIBA Basketball World Cup in 2014. The team was coached by Mike Krzyzewski of Duke University, with assistant coaches Jim Boeheim (Syracuse), Tom Thibodeau (New York Knicks), and Monty Williams (Phoenix Suns).

Timeline
 August 6, 2015: 34-man roster announced
 January 18, 2016: 30-man roster announced
 July 17: Start of training camp
 July 22 – August 1: Exhibition games
 August 6–21: 2016 Summer Olympics

Roster
The 2016 team consisted of just two returning players from the  2012 Olympic gold-medal winning team, Kevin Durant and the new team captain, Carmelo Anthony.

The following were also candidates to make the team:

2015 Basketball Showcase
On August 12, 2015, USA Basketball announced 19 NBA players to participate in the following day's 2015 USA Basketball Showcase in Las Vegas, where they will be divided into two squads, USA Blue, and USA White, where USA Blue Team will be coached by USA National Team assistant coach Monty Williams (Oklahoma City Thunder) while USA White Team will be coached by USA National Team assistant coach Tom Thibodeau (Minnesota Timberwolves).

The Blue Team included starters Harrison Barnes (Golden State Warriors), Bradley Beal (Washington Wizards), DeMar DeRozan (Toronto Raptors), and Andre Drummond (Detroit Pistons), with reserve players Kenneth Faried (Denver Nuggets), Rudy Gay (Sacramento Kings), Amir Johnson (Boston Celtics), Victor Oladipo (Orlando Magic), and Elfrid Payton (Orlando Magic).

The White Team included starters Kawhi Leonard (San Antonio Spurs), Blake Griffin (Los Angeles Clippers), DeMarcus Cousins (Sacramento Kings), Klay Thompson (Golden State Warriors), and Michael Carter-Williams (Milwaukee Bucks), with reserve players Mason Plumlee (Portland Trail Blazers), Terrence Jones (Houston Rockets), Arron Afflalo (New York Knicks), and Draymond Green (Golden State Warriors). C. J. Watson (Orlando Magic) was included in the roster announcement but did not play.

Exhibition games
The United States' 12-man roster began its exhibition schedule against 2004 Olympic champion Argentina. They also faced 2015 FIBA Asia gold medalist China and 2015 FIBA Americas champion Venezuela. The schedule concluded with 2015 FIBA Africa champion Nigeria in Houston. The United States Olympic Committee used Houston as a departure point for many Olympic teams, providing them with credentials and provisions on their way out to Brazil.

Olympic play

Preliminary round

China

Venezuela

Australia

Serbia

France

Knockout round

Quarterfinal – Argentina

Semifinal – Spain

Final – Serbia

Statistics

Notes

References

External links

 Games of the XXXIth Olympiad -- 2016 at usab.com

United States at the Olympic men's basketball tournament
United States
Olympics